Loecknitz Castle is a castle in the municipality of Loecknitz in southeastern Mecklenburg-Western Pomerania, of which today only remnants, such as the octagonal keep are obtained. Loecknitz Castle dates back 1212.

References 

Castles in Mecklenburg-Western Pomerania
Burial sites of the House of Pomerania
Duchy of Pomerania
Buildings and structures in Vorpommern-Greifswald